Aanaa Naamua Enin is a Ghanaian politician and diplomat. She was a member of the Provisional National Defence Council (PNDC) military government of Ghana. She has also served as Ghana's ambassador to the Netherlands.

Politics
Aanaa Enin was made a member of the military PNDC government in 1983. The PNDC was formed following the overthrow of the Limann government in December 1981 by a military coup d'état led by Jerry Rawlings who became the Head of state of Ghana. She served in this capacity until 1989.
In 2019, she was appointed to the Complaints Committee of the NDC.

Diplomatic service
Enin served as Ghana's ambassador to the Netherlands during the rule of John  Evans Atta Mills of the National Democratic Congress (NDC) from 2010 to about 2012.

References

Year of birth missing (living people)
Living people
Government ministers of Ghana
Ghanaian women ambassadors
Ambassadors of Ghana to the Netherlands
National Democratic Congress (Ghana) politicians
20th-century Ghanaian women politicians